Jakob Ritter von Danner (7 August 1865 in Queichheim/Landau – 28 December 1942 in Munich) was a Bavarian general in the Imperial German Army and the Reichswehr. As commandant of the Munich garrison of the Reichswehr, he was a central figure in putting down the attempted Beer Hall Putsch by Adolf Hitler and the Nazis in 1923.

Born Jakob Danner, he was commissioned a lieutenant in the Royal Bavarian Army on 7 July 1886. He was promoted to Oberleutnant (1st lieutenant) on 6 November 1894 and captain on 28 October 1901. He served in the German expeditionary forces sent to China during the Boxer Rebellion, where he earned the Bavarian Military Merit Order 4th Class with Swords, the Prussian Crown Order 4th Class with Swords and the Austrian Military Merit Cross 3rd Class with War Decoration.

Danner was promoted to major on 7 March 1910 and at the onset of World War I commanded the 2nd Battalion of Royal Bavarian 7. Infanterie-Regiment Prinz Leopold. On 29 December 1914, he took command of the newly formed Bavarian 18th Reserve Infantry Regiment (Bayerisches Reserve-Infanterie-Regiment Nr. 18). He commanded the regiment, except for brief respites, until July 1918. During the war, he was again decorated for valor. On 22 December 1914 he was awarded the Bavarian Military Merit Order 3rd Class with Swords, followed by the 3rd Class with Crown and Swords on 29 January 1917 and the Officer's Cross with Swords on 26 September 1917. He received both the Iron Cross 1st and 2nd Class and the Knight's Cross with Swords of the Royal House Order of Hohenzollern from Prussia. Austria-Hungary awarded the Order of the Iron Crown 3rd Class with War Decoration. He was wounded several times, and was recognized with the Silver Wound Badge.

For valor on 1 December 1916, then-Lieutenant Colonel Danner was decorated with the Military Max Joseph Order, Bavaria's highest military honor, on 1 September 1917. For a Bavarian commoner, award of this order of knighthood conferred nobility, and Lt. Col. Danner received his patent of nobility from the King of Bavaria on 20 September 1917, taking the title "Ritter von".

From 6 July to 15 September 1918, Colonel Ritter von Danner commanded the 12th Bavarian Reserve Infantry Brigade. He took command of the 21st Bavarian Infantry Brigade 5 Oct., which he led through the end of the war and into 1919. From mid-1919 until 30 September 1920, he commanded Reichswehr Brigade Nr. 24 in Nuremberg.

On 1 October 1920, Colonel Ritter von Danner took command of the Munich city garrison (Stadtkommandantur München) and was soon promoted to Generalmajor. He led this command, which also entailed serving as deputy commander of Wehrkreis VII, until retiring on 31 July 1925 as a Generalleutnant. It was during this period that the Nazi Party, under the leadership of Adolf Hitler and its allies, attempted a coup d'état to overthrow the Bavarian government. General Ritter von Danner reacted quickly, placing troops on alert and acting to ensure that the commander of Wehrkreis VII, which controlled all troops in Bavaria, did not support the putsch attempt or vacillate in the face of it. Three days after the failure of the Beer Hall Putsch, Hitler was arrested and charged with treason.
On 1 January 1925, Danner was promoted to lieutenant general. He retired on 31 July 1925.

Danner was the first president of the Bavarian Warrior League and later the second president of the Kyffhäuser Reichskriegerbund.

Decorations and awards
 Order of the Red Eagle, 4th class
 Iron Cross of 1914, 1st and 2nd class
 Order of the Crown, 4th class with Swords (Prussia)
 Knight's Cross of the Royal House Order of Hohenzollern with Swords
 Wound Badge (1918) in Silver
 Knight's Cross of the Military Order of Max Joseph
 Officer's Cross of the Military Merit Order with Swords and Crown (Bavaria)
 Service Medal, 1st class (Bavaria)
 Order of the Iron Crown, 3rd class with war decoration (Austria)
 Military Merit Cross, 3rd class with war decoration (Austria-Hungary)

References 

 Bayerisches Kriegsministerium (Herausg.): Militär-Handbuch des Königreichs Bayern 1914 (Bavarian War Ministry (eds.): Military Handbook of the Kingdom of Bavaria 1914)
 Deutscher Offizier-Bund (Herausg.): Ehren-Rangliste des ehemaligen Deutschen Heeres auf Grund der Ranglisten von 1914 mit den inzwischen eingetretenen Veränderungen, 1926 (League of German Officers (eds.): Honor Rank List of the former German Army on the Basis of the Rank Lists of 1914 with Intervening Changes, 1926)
 Reichswehrministerium (Herausg.): Ranglisten des Deutschen Reichsheeres 1924, 1925, 1926 (Reichswehr Ministry (eds.): Rank Lists of the German Army, 1924, 1925 and 1926 editions)
 Konrad Krafft von Dellmensingen: Das Bayernbuch vom Weltkriege 1914-1918, Stuttgart 1930 (Konrad Krafft von Dellmensingen: The Bavaria Book of the World War 1914-1918, Stuttgart, 1930)
 Bayerisches Kriegsarchiv: Die Bayern im großen Krieg, 2.Auflage 1923 (Bavarian War Archives: Bavaria in the Great War, 2nd edition, 1923)
 Bayerisches Kriegsarchiv: "Bayerns Goldenes Ehrenbuch", gewidmet den Inhabern der höchsten bayerischen Kriegs-auszeichnungen aus dem Weltkrieg 1914/18, München 1928 (Bavarian War Archives: "Bavaria's Golden Book of Honor", dedicated to the holders of the highest Bavarian war decorations of the World War 1914-18, Munich, 1928)
 Rudolf von Kramer, Otto Freiherr von Waldenfels und Dr. Günther Freiherr von Pechmann: Virtuti Pro Patria: Der königlich bayerische Militär-Max-Joseph-Orden, München 1966 (Rudolf von Kramer, Otto Freiherr von Waldenfels & Dr. Günther Freiherr von Pechmann: Virtuti Pro Patria: The Royal Bavarian Military Max Joseph Order, Munich, 1966)

1865 births
1942 deaths
People from the Kingdom of Bavaria
Opposers who participated in the Beer Hall Putsch
Bavarian generals
German military personnel of the Boxer Rebellion
German Army personnel of World War I
Knights of the Military Order of Max Joseph
Officers Crosses of the Military Merit Order (Bavaria)
Lieutenant generals of the Reichswehr
People from Landau